Constantino Urbieta Sosa (12 August 1907 – 12 December 1983) was a Paraguayan-Argentine footballer that played as a midfielder.

Born in Asunción, Urbieta started his career in Club Nacional before playing for Argentine clubs C.A. Tigre, Godoy Cruz Antonio Tomba, San Lorenzo de Almagro and C.A. Estudiantes.

Urbieta Sosa was part of the Paraguay national football team in 1931 and also played for the Argentina national team that participated in the 1934 FIFA World Cup, being the second foreign-born player to play for Argentina a FIFA World Cup.

References

External links
 

1907 births
1983 deaths
Sportspeople from Asunción
Naturalized citizens of Argentina
Argentine footballers
Argentina international footballers
Paraguayan footballers
Paraguay international footballers
Club Nacional footballers
Club Atlético Tigre footballers
San Lorenzo de Almagro footballers
Expatriate footballers in Paraguay
Dual internationalists (football)
1934 FIFA World Cup players
Paraguayan emigrants to Argentina
Association football midfielders